Ube ice cream is a Filipino ice cream flavor prepared using ube (purple yam) as the main ingredient. This ice cream is often used in making the dessert halo-halo.

History
Due to its vivid violet color and mildly sweet and nutty taste, ube has been a staple of Filipino desserts, most notably ube halaya. The earliest recorded use of ube in ice cream was in a recipe from 1922, when ice cream's introduction to Filipino culture during the American occupation (as the local adaptation sorbetes) led to new flavors such as mango, pinipig and melon. The recipe called for mashed ube, milk, sugar and crushed ice. During that time, ice cream was also hand-churned in a garapinyera, a manually operated ice cream mixer.

Ube ice cream has risen in popularity outside the Philippines, due to its use by Filipino immigrants in restaurants (often with halo-halo) and Trader Joe's line of ube products, its vivid violet color and the spread of its pictures on social media.

Use in halo-halo

Ube ice cream is a common ingredient in halo-halo, a popular Filipino dessert consisting of a mix of various ingredients, such as coconut, sago, sweetened beans, slices of fruit such as jackfruit or mango, leche flan and nata de coco, and ube itself in halaya form. Ube is seen as an essential ingredient of halo-halo due to lending the dessert its distinctive flavor and violet color. Thus, ube ice cream may be used in place of or together with ube halaya. Since evaporated milk is another essential ingredient of halo-halo, using ube ice cream as well makes for a creamier recipe.

See also
Ube cake
Ube crinkles
Queso ice cream

References

Philippine desserts
Ice cream
Ube dishes